Go Go Club is a Chinese boy band under management of SMG Dong Fang Zhi Xing. While originally consisting of four members, the current group members are Zhong Kai (simplified Chinese: 钟凯; traditional Chinese: 鍾凱), Chen Zeyu, Mao Fangyuan (simplified Chinese: 毛方圆; traditional Chinese: 毛方圓) . The height of all members is 188 cm.

They rose to fame after competing in the Chinese idol TV show, 2006 My Hero (simplified Chinese: 06加油！好男儿; traditional Chinese: 06加油！好男兒). In 2007, Go Go Club released their first EP, 漫长的约会, and then released a first album, 兄弟联同名专辑.

Discography

Filmography

Films
2009 Pleasant Goat and Big Big Wolf

Television
2007  My Prince(青蛙王子)
2008 The Prince of Tennis
2009 Armor Hero(铠甲勇士)
2009 The Prince of Tennis 2(加油！网球王子)

Bibliography
 September 28, 2007: GO GO SAIPAN EXPOSURE (青春拍立得) (Photobook)

External links 
  Zhong Kai's blog
  Chen Zeyu's blog
  Mao Fangyuan's blog

Chinese Mandopop singers
Mandopop musical groups